Alfred Rowland House, also known as Riverwood, is a historic home located at Lumberton, Robeson County, North Carolina.  It was built between 1875 and 1880, and is a two-story, cross-gable, side-hall plan, transitional Italianate / Greek Revival style frame dwelling.  The front facade features an engaged, double-tier, pedimented porch.

It was added to the National Register of Historic Places in 2008.

References

Houses on the National Register of Historic Places in North Carolina
Greek Revival houses in North Carolina
Italianate architecture in North Carolina
Houses completed in 1880
Houses in Robeson County, North Carolina
National Register of Historic Places in Robeson County, North Carolina